Much (an abbreviation for its full name MuchMusic) is a Canadian English language discretionary specialty channel owned by BCE Inc. through its Bell Media subsidiary that airs programming aimed at teenagers and young adults.

MuchMusic launched on August 31, 1984, under the ownership of CHUM Limited, and was originally focused on music programming, including blocks of music videos and original series focusing on Canadian musicians. In the years since its acquisition by Bell, Much has cancelled the majority of its music programming due to budget and staffing cuts. The channel's full name was retired in 2013 in reflection of its decreasing reliance on music-related programming.

History

Under CHUM (1984–2006)
MuchMusic was licensed on April 2, 1984, by the Canadian Radio-television and Telecommunications Commission (CRTC) to CHUM Limited. It had faced competition from two other proposed services. One of them, CMTV Canadian Music Television, was deemed not to have sufficient financial resources. The third applicant was Rogers Radio Broadcasting. The CRTC believed that the Canadian market could only support one music video service and CHUM's proposal was chosen because of various commitments it had made and the company's expertise in music programming. The station was initially patterned on City Limits, an overnight weekend rock music show which had aired on sister station CITY-TV since 1983.

Shortly thereafter, MuchMusic was launched on August 31, 1984, as one of the first Canadian cable specialty channels. It was headed by the channel's founders John Martin and Moses Znaimer. The first video played on MuchMusic was "an early music-to-film synchronization short from the 1920s which featured Eubie Blake performing Snappy Songs." The first video made specifically for television air play was Rush's "The Enemy Within". MuchMusic's slogan, and on-air advertising, was "The Nation's Music Station".

Making use of CHUM's facilities and production teams, the channel produced many specialty musical and variety shows, including the long-running dance show Electric Circus and the late 1980s game show Test Pattern, and Citytv shows such as City Limits, The Power Hour, The MuchMusic Spotlight and The New Music also became integral parts of the MuchMusic schedule.

The channel's format consisted primarily of an eight-hour daily block which mixed scheduled shows with VJ-hosted general "videoflow", which would then be repeated two more times to fill the 24-hour schedule. Some variance from this model was seen with the late-night shows City Limits and Too Much 4 Much (a show that featured panel discussions surrounding controversial music videos that the channel had refused to air in regular rotation), and live specials such as Intimate and Interactive.

For the first few years of the channel, it was classified as a pay television service and was therefore offered largely in bundles along with other pay-stations such as First Choice and TSN, and would occasionally offer free preview weekends for non-subscribers. The subscriber count was at 500,000 customers by December 1984. In December 1987, MuchMusic received permission from the CRTC to move to basic cable lineups beginning on September 1, 1989; in the interim cable operators could offer the channel as a negative-option expanded basic channel.

A US version of MuchMusic, originally known as "MuchMusic USA", was launched in the U.S. on July 1, 1994, through a partnership with Rainbow Media. The network was largely a simulcast of the Canadian version with U.S. advertising and acquired programs. The network would go into its own direction over time, eventually rebranding as Fuse in 2003.

In 1995, the annual Canadian Music Video Awards were renamed to the "MuchMusic Video Awards" (presently known as the "iHeartRadio MMVAs" as of 2018). Since 1996, the ceremonies have been held outside the formerly-named "MuchMusic Headquarters" on 299 Queen Street West, the present-day main offices for Bell Media's speciality channels.

In 2002, MuchMusic introduced promos that consisted of one of twelve images of a VJ posing in front of the network's logo, lasting for only 1/60th of a second each. The "quickies" were recognized with a Guinness World Record for the world's shortest television commercial.

Under Bell (2006–present)
In July 2006, Bell Globemedia (later called CTVglobemedia) announced that it would purchase CHUM for an estimated $1.7 billion CAD, included in the sale was MuchMusic. The sale was subject to CRTC approval and was approved in June 2007, with the transaction completed on June 22, 2007, while the Citytv stations were sold to Rogers Media in the same year. Since then, MuchMusic has aired a vast number of non-music related shows, mainly teen dramas and reality shows.

In 2010, the CRTC rejected a request by CTVglobemedia to reduce the percentage of music video programming that the channel shows from 50 to 25 percent. CTV's second request to the CRTC to reduce and reposition its Canadian programming was also denied. For the reasoning behind these requests, CTV explained that "music videos no longer distinguish the service as they are readily available through other sources." This was met with mixed reaction by music fans and drew the ire of notable artists.

On June 1, 2011, MuchMusic launched its high definition simulcast feed.

Beginning in September 2013, the channel would air more comedy programming targeting young adult men during the late afternoon and primetime hours, much of it moved from The Comedy Network. Such shows included Comedy Central series (such as South Park, Tosh.0 and The Jeselnik Offensive), reruns of The Simpsons and The Cleveland Show, as well as Late Night with Jimmy Fallon and Conan. These changes came when Comedy's request for licence amendments to reduce requirements for Canadian content and increase the amount of animated programming it could air was denied. The channel officially dropped the word "Music" from its name in press releases and promos as a result of this revamp, becoming known simply as Much, and the channel became a sister network to Canal D, Canal Vie, Vrak, and Z. Subsequently, a variety of other Astral Media properties (Family, Disney XD, the two Disney Junior services, MusiquePlus, MusiMax, seven radio stations, the Teletoon networks, Historia, and Séries+) — were sold to third parties.

Most of the channel's previous non-music programming, such as Pretty Little Liars and Degrassi, moved to sister channels M3 (formerly MuchMoreMusic & MuchMore) and MTV respectively. At the same time the channel cut back further on original music-related programming apart from Video on Trial, The Wedge, countdowns, and other non-hosted blocks of music videos, with New.Music.Live. confirmed to have been cancelled and the likes of RapCity no longer appearing on Much's schedule.  By the summer of 2014, amidst production and staffing cutbacks, the Countdown went on hiatus and Much's remaining original shows, including a revamped Video on Trial, were cancelled.

Meanwhile, in August, Much celebrated its 30th anniversary. A half-hour anniversary special, "30 Years of Much", aired on August 30, 2014, and was preceded by a full-day countdown of The 100 Greatest Videos Ever. Repeats of both the special and the countdown aired throughout the Labour Day weekend. On September 27, 2014, the Countdown returned with a revamped format.

On April 1, 2015, Much announced the launch of Much Digital Studios (later renamed Much Studios), a production unit and YouTube multi-channel network. The network features content catered towards Much's demographic of 12-34s, and would also be integrated into their on-air programming. Such content includes the Mike On Much podcast, hosted by Mike Veerman, co-produced by Arkells lead singer Max Kerman, and featuring segments led by Shane Cunningham. The podcast eventually spawned the spin-off series Much Studios presents "Mike on Much in Conversation With...", which premiered in 2018 on sibling service Crave.

On August 12, 2016, Bell Media sold MuchLoud, MuchRetro, MuchVibe and Juicebox to Stingray Digital. On September 1, 2016, M3 was shut down and replaced by Gusto, a cooking and lifestyle-oriented TV network that Bell Media acquired, after the original Gusto TV closed in March 2016.

In late 2017, Much further cut back on music programming, reducing its music blocks to the morning hours and removing the Much Countdown from its schedule. MuchFACT was also discontinued, as a result of the CRTC having dropped the requirement for Much to fund it. On October 11, 2017, Much premiered Sides*, a new talk show which discusses youth issues; it is streamed live on Twitter, and compiled into weekly televised editions on the channel. In November 2017, Much began to air a Friday-night block known as Icons, which featured airings of music-related documentaries.

In 2019, the daytime Playlist block of music videos was discontinued and replaced with library programming, citing decreased interest and viewership. In addition, that year's MMVAs, which were moved to August the previous year, were delayed due to scheduling conflicts with the 2019 MTV Video Music Awards. The Much Retro Lunch block remained the only regularly-scheduled music video programming on the channel, with the network citing its popularity among youth as a factor. The block was discontinued on March 20, 2020, and was later replaced by Corner Gas. The last music video that the channel aired was Irreplaceable by Beyonce.

On June 10, 2021, it was announced that the "MuchMusic" name would be revived for a new "digital-first" network to launch on July 7 in-partnership with TikTok. The network would feature new "creator-driven content", including revivals of old Much programming. Meanwhile, the linear TV channel would continue with its current format and programming under the "Much" brand.

Programming

Much's main programming includes original series from Comedy Central (select shows not seen on CTV Comedy Channel) and other acquired comedies, reality shows, broadcasts of feature films, encores of shows seen on sibling networks, and reruns of other shows sourced from Bell Media's program libraries to fulfil Canadian content requirements.

The network's music programming previously consisted of music video blocks seen on weekdays and the annual MuchMusic Video Awards (MMVAs), of which most of its ceremonies had been held outside the network's headquarters on 299 Queen Street West during Father's Day weekend from 2002 to 2017. The network also produced and aired several original series, both in-house productions (such as the MuchMusic Countdown, Video on Trial, and The Wedge) and scripted series (such as The L.A. Complex and seasons 9–13 of Degrassi: The Next Generation, after its move from CTV in 2010.).

Relationship with MTV 
Since its inception, Much has aired numerous programs acquired from MTV. Beginning in 1994, MTV's then-parent company Viacom would attempt to launch localized versions of the network through other partners; Craig Media first launched MTV Canada and MTV2 Canada as digital cable networks in 2001. Due to CRTC genre protection rules, MTV Canada was forbidden from unduly competing with existing analog channels, such as MuchMusic, and its license henceforth restricted the channel to only devoting 10% of its weekly programming to "music video clips".

CHUM filed a complaint with the CRTC over MTV Canada in early-2002, alleging that 60% of the schedule contained music video programming. CHUM also alleged that the licensing deal with MTV was a "bait and switch" to encroach upon MuchMusic's protected format, rather than deliver the broadly teen-based channel it had promised in the licensing process. Craig disputed the allegations as inaccurate, arguing that CHUM had incorrectly classified any programming "that has some connection to the general topic of music or music videos" (CRTC category 8a, "Music and dance other than music video programs or clips"), as counting as CRTC category 8b "music video clips" programming for the purposes of the complaint, and that it only aired two hours of purely music video-based programming per-day (accounting for 8% of weekly programming). Upon analysis of MTV Canada's programming, the CRTC ruled that music videos played within a category 8a program still counted as music video programming for the purposes of this limit, and found the network in violation of its licence for this and failure to deliver the broadly teen-based service it promised. CHUM would later acquire Craig Media and both MTV-branded channels were re-launched in June 2005; with MTV becoming a youth entertainment channel called Razer, and MTV2 becoming an interactive channel called PunchMuch.

In 2006, Viacom would partner with CTVglobemedia to relaunch TalkTV as a new Canadian incarnation of MTV. The agreement also gave the company rights to air MTV programming on other sibling outlets.

299 Queen St. West, a documentary film by Sean Menard about the channel's early years, is slated for release in 2023.

Affiliated channels
With the success of MuchMusic, several spinoff channels have been launched within Canada and around the world, including

Former
 MusiquePlus: Launched in 1986, it was developed as a Canadian French language version of MuchMusic. In September 2008, new owner Astral Media separated the channel from the network and introduced a new logo. In August 2019, new owner V Media Group relaunched the channel as Elle Fictions with a female-focused programming lineup.
 MusiMax: A sister channel to MusiquePlus focused on adult contemporary music, and was developed as the French language version of MuchMoreMusic. In August 2016, new owner V Media Group rebranded the channel as Max with an entertainment-focused programming lineup.
 PunchMuch: an all-request music video service consisting of music videos from various genres. On November 17, 2011, PunchMuch was replaced by Juicebox, a new music video channel aimed at pre-teens.  Stingray Digital relaunched that channel as Stingray Juicebox in 2016.
 M3: Originally known as MuchMoreMusic, this channel focused on adult contemporary, classic rock, classic hits and even generally lighter music in addition to current pop-rock hits like its sister stations Much and MTV. In March 2009, it was relaunched as MuchMore. In 2013, it rebranded under the M3 name, marketed as an entertainment-focused "superstation" and a separate brand. In September 2016, the channel was shut down and its broadcast licence was used to relaunch Gusto on all service providers.
 MuchLoud: Focuses on rock, modern rock, alternative, punk and metal. In August 2016, new owner Stingray Digital relaunched the channel as Stingray Loud.
 MuchVibe: Focuses on urban music such as hip hop, R&B, and reggae. In August 2016, new owner Stingray Digital relaunched the channel as Stingray Vibe.
 MuchRetro: Focuses on music videos from the 1980s to the early 2000s. Originally known as MuchMoreRetro, a spinoff of what would be known as M3, the channel rebranded on November 1, 2013, aligning itself with the Much brand. In 2016, new owner Stingray Digital relaunched the channel as Stingray Retro.

International

Current
 MuchMusic Latin America: Launched in September 1992, originally available in Argentina only, currently distributed on several pay-TV operators in several Latin American countries. it was formerly owned by WarnerMedia Latin America from 2019 to 2022. It is now owned by Warner Bros. Discovery Latin America as of April 8, 2022. Unlike its Canadian counterpart, it airs more music programming instead of comedy programming.
 MuchMusic Czech: Launched in 2006, available in the Czech Republic.

Past
 MuchUSA: Launched in 1994. Licence to use MuchMusic name and content revoked, and renamed Fuse in 2003. A number of MuchMusic programs were broadcast on this channel in an agreement between the two networks, which share certain programs at times. These included The Wedge, Video on Trial (both Canadian, and an American version) as well as the MuchMusic Video Awards.
 MuchMusic Brasil: Launched in 2000. Ceased broadcasting in 2001.
 MuchMusic also had a programming block on MTV3 in Finland called JYRKI.

Much personalities

VJs (1984–2014)
Several individuals have served as MuchMusic's on-air hosts, or video jockeys ("VJs"). A number of notable Canadian and American television personalities either began their careers at MuchMusic or spent time there. Among these are J.D. Roberts who, under the name John Roberts, is a national correspondent for Fox News; Christopher Ward, a noted songwriter and producer who collaborated musically with Mike Myers on the Austin Powers movies; Sook-Yin Lee, now a noted CBC Radio host and actress; Terry David Mulligan, a prolific film and TV character actor; actress Amanda Walsh; Erica Ehm, who became a noted songwriter after leaving Much; and George Stroumboulopoulos, who became a television personality on CBC, U.S. network CNN and Sportsnet.

Former

Steve Anthony
Matte Babel
Glen Baxter
Jeanne Beker
Laurie Brown
Rick Campanelli
Kim Clarke Champniss
Lance Chilton
Tim Deegan
Monika Deol
Angela Dohrmann
Denise Donlon
Phoebe Dykstra
Ed the Sock
Tyrone "T-Rex" Edwards
Erica Ehm (Erica Miechowsky)
Simon Evans
Rainbow Sun Francks
Diego Fuentes
Dan Gallagher
Jesse Giddings
Craig F. Halket
Jennifer Hollett
Bradford How
Namugenyi Kiwanuka
George Lagogianes
Avi Lewis
Sook-Yin Lee
Patrick Lima
Ziggy Lorenc
Catherine McClenahan (first female VJ)
Leah Miller
Terry David Mulligan
Nardwuar the Human Serviette
Rachel Perry
Juliette Powell
Nadine Ramkisson
Natalie Richard
Daniel Richler
J.D. Roberts
Teresa Roncon
Hannah Simone
Devon Soltendieck
George Stroumboulopoulos
Sarah Taylor
Lauren Toyota
Liz Trinnear
Amanda Walsh
Christopher Ward
Matt Wells
Bill Welychka
Chloe Wilde
Scott Willats
Michael Williams
Byron Wong
Tony "Master T" Young

Some of the former Much VJs have moved onto other opportunities within Bell Media's entertainment brands like etalk and E!, but occasionally return for special Much events like the annual iHeartRadio Much Music Video Awards.

VJ Search

Every few years, when new video jockeys were needed, Much ran a "VJ Search" to pick one new VJ to join the channel. They would usually visit cities across Canada and pick people who appear to show potential through their audition. In earlier years, the VJ Search was usually a two-part show, but in 2006 it evolved into its own reality series called MuchMusic VJ Search. As a result of that series, Tim Deegan was chosen as a VJ. It was followed in 2009 by VJ 2.0, where the winner Liz Trinnear was also picked to join the channel. The final search, Much VJ Search, which Chloe Wilde won in 2013.

Much Creators (2015–present)
Much Creators are selected social media personalities, mostly established and emerging Canadian YouTubers. The first ever Fan Fave Much Creator award was won by YouTwoTV during the 2017 iHeartRadio MMVAs.

Current

Jus Reign
4YallEntertainment
Michael Rizzi
The Danocracy
Alayna Joy
YouTwoTV
ThatDudeMcFly
Karli Woods
Istiana Bestari
Wahlid Mohammad
Melissa Merk
Tasha Leelyn
Deejdesign
SneakerTalk
Jaclyn Forbes
Candace Leca
Karina V
RealisticallySaying
Zak Longo
Moving Mind Studio
Dylan Zhang
Fateh Doe
Bongo
Andrew Quo
Joey Kidney
Alex Duckworth
Naomi Leanage
Matt O'Brien
The Baker Twins
Camille Co
Bianca Harris
Tyler Shaw
Shane Cunningham
Dan Talevski
Rayn Magic
Laurier Lachance

Former
This is a list of Much Creators who no longer appear on the Much Creators website.

Mila Victoria
SickickMusic
Ron Dias TV
AllegraLouise
AmandaRachlee
Letitia Kiu
Chelsi Madonna
SidePonyNation
Rosette Luve 
Top 5 Unknowns

See also

Countdown (MuchMusic)
MusiquePlus (now known as Elle Fictions)
Fromage

References

Further reading

External links
 

 
Bell Media networks
Music television channels
Music video networks in Canada
Television channels and stations established in 1984
1984 in Canadian music
English-language television stations in Canada
1984 establishments in Canada
Men's interest channels